Transmembrane BAX inhibitor motif-containing protein 4 is a protein that in humans is encoded by the TMBIM4 gene. It is also known as human Golgi anti-apoptotic protein (hGAAP) due to its function and sub-cellular localization.

Function 

Human GAAP  is a protein present in the Golgi  that helps regulate apoptosis, a form of programmed cell death. By regulating the fluxes of Ca+2, an increase of GAAP can help prevent apoptosis. GAAP is also involved in promoting cell migration  and has been identified as a novel Golgi cation channel. Other GAAPs can be found in all eucaryotes analyzed and in some bacteria. A viral GAAP (vGAAP) can also be found in some strains of vaccinia virus, the live vaccine used to eradicate smallpox.

See also 
Golgi
Apoptosis
Ion channel
Cell migration

References

Further reading